Kendall Francois (July 26, 1971 – September 11, 2014) was a serial killer from Poughkeepsie, New York, convicted of killing eight women, from 1996 to 1998. After his conviction and sentencing, Francois was housed in the Attica Correctional Facility until being transferred to the Wende Correctional Facility shortly before his death. It was revealed in his trial in 2000 that he tested positive for HIV in 1995, but this was not said to have been related to his death.

Trial and sentence 
In August 2000, Francois was sentenced to life in prison without the possibility of parole after pleading guilty to 8 counts of first degree murder. The plea agreement allowed him to avoid a possible death sentence. Francois was incarcerated in Attica Correctional Facility until shortly before his death.

He died in the Wende Correctional Facility on September 11, 2014, at the age of 43. The official cause of death was "AIDS related illness” According to a woman who corresponded with Francois in prison, he had HIV.

Victims

See also 
 List of serial killers in the United States

References

Further reading 

 
Rowe, Claudia (2017). The spider and the fly. HarperLuxe. 

1971 births
1996 murders in the United States
2014 deaths
20th-century American criminals
American male criminals
American people convicted of murder
American prisoners sentenced to life imprisonment
American serial killers
Crimes against sex workers in the United States
Criminals from New York (state)
Male serial killers
People convicted of murder by New York (state)
People from Poughkeepsie, New York
People with HIV/AIDS
Prisoners sentenced to life imprisonment by New York (state)
Prisoners who died in New York (state) detention
Serial killers who died in prison custody
Violence against women in the United States